Stíny noci (English: Shadows of the Night) is a 1994 Czech adventure video game developed by Computer Experts and authored by  Vladimír Peniska. It was originally distributed by Vochozka Trading. By 1999, the game could be freely downloaded on the Internet.

Plot and game play 
The player is a secret detective who has been tasked with capturing a member of the mafia for a big reward.

Players navigate through a series of screens. Possible directions to travel and objects are listed on the screen. Players are able to die. The graphic have a  resolution of 320 × 200 pixels. Each location is described with words, while accompanied by an image. It is strictly not considered a point-and-click adventure by Historie a kontext produkce počítačových her žánru adventure v České republice.

Critical reception 
Freegame.cz thought the game was enjoyable, despite having outdated graphics.

Textovky.cz thought it was a great game.

References

External links 
 PC Engine
 Excalibur
 Score

1994 video games
Adventure games
Detective video games
DOS games
DOS-only games
Video games developed in the Czech Republic
Single-player video games
Vochozka Trading games